Philine constricta is a species of sea snail, a marine opisthobranch gastropod mollusk in the family Philinidae, the headshield slugs.

References

Further reading 
 Powell A. W. B., New Zealand Mollusca, William Collins Publishers Ltd, Auckland, New Zealand 1979

External links 
 Tepapa

Philinidae
Gastropods described in 1906